Clanculus stigmatarius is a species of sea snail, a marine gastropod mollusk in the family Trochidae, the top snails.

Description
This species has a widely conical trochid (top-shaped) shell, with a more highly raised spire than is typical for the genus. The shell has spirally ribbed sculpture consisting of conspicuous regular rows of robust, round beads. The whorls show a profile with a deep suture, and the final whorl is slightly inflated. The aperture of the shell is white, oval, with a strongly ridged lip. The umbilicus is deep. The main color of the body of the shell is tan to golden, with a distinctive repeating pattern of rounded beads in colors that include bright pink, red, and ivory white.

Distribution
This species occurs from Port Douglas to Capricorn and Bunker Group, Queensland, Australia in the Indo-Pacific.
Alternately, the distribution is listed as: Australia, New Caledonia, Western Pacific, Philippines.  A single reference has been found for the species in Okinawa, Japan.

References

 Adams, A. 1853. Contributions towards a monograph of the Trochidae, a family of gastropodous Mollusca. Proceedings of the Zoological Society of London 1851(19): 150-192 
 Fischer, P. 1877. Genres Calcar, Trochus, Xenophora, Tectarius et Risella. pp. 115–240 in Keiner, L.C. (ed.). Spécies general et iconographie des coquilles vivantes. Paris : J.B. Baillière Vol. 11
 Hedley, C. 1907. The Mollusca of Mast Head Reef, Capricorn Group, Queensland, part II. Proceedings of the Linnean Society of New South Wales 32: 476-513, pls 16-2
 Oliver, W.R.B. 1915. The Mollusca of the Kermadec Islands. Transactions of the New Zealand Institute 47: 509-568 
 Short, J.W. & Potter, D.G. 1987. Shells of Queensland and The Great Barrier Reef. Drummoyne, NSW : Golden press Pty Ltd 135 pp., 60 pl.
 Wilson, B. 1993. Australian Marine Shells. Prosobranch Gastropods. Kallaroo, Western Australia : Odyssey Publishing Vol. 1 408 pp
 Jansen, P. 1995. A review of the genus Clanculus Montfort, 1810 (Gastropoda: Trochidae) in Australia, with description of a new subspecies and the introduction of a nomen novum. Vita Marina 43(1-2): 39-62

stigmatarius
Gastropods described in 1853